"One Step Closer" is a song by Irish rock band U2, and is the ninth track on their 2004 studio album, How to Dismantle an Atomic Bomb.

The song has a slow tempo, with lead vocalist Bono's lyrics centered on traffic images. The origins of "One Step Closer" date back to the recording sessions for their 2000 album All That You Can't Leave Behind. It was revived for Atomic Bomb, with Lanois introducing a pedal steel guitar in addition to guitars from the Edge and Bono, and musical influences varying from country music to the Velvet Underground making themselves felt.  One recording of the song ran for more than 15 minutes, with Bono adding many verses that were subsequently dropped.  Producer Jacknife Lee also contributed to the final version of the recording.

"One Step Closer" is billed in the album with thanks to Noel Gallagher of Oasis. The title of the song comes from a conversation Bono had with Gallagher about Bono's dying father, Bob Hewson. Bono asked, "Do you think he believes in God?" to which Gallagher replied, "Well, he's one step closer to knowing." As with most U2 songs, however, multiple readings are available, with the singer's feeling of being lost, but still drifting towards some kind of understanding, possible at any age. Verdicts varied based on the listener: Bono biographer Mick Wall felt the song was "clearly linked" to Bono's father, and made for "painful if beautiful listening," Chicago Tribune reviewer Greg Kot did not make the same Bono connection and felt that Lanois' "foggy atmospherics" masked a lack of ideas, while Christianity Today saw it as a "sadly uncertain, yet hopeful" depiction of Bono's father having a crisis of faith.

The song has never been performed in concert by U2. It was rehearsed before the Innocence + Experience Tour in 2015, but was ultimately not performed at any show.

Personnel
U2
 Bono – lead vocals, guitar
 The Edge – guitar, backing vocals
 Adam Clayton – bass guitar
 Larry Mullen Jr. – drums, percussion

Additional performers
 Daniel Lanois - additional guitar, pedal steel guitar
 Jacknife Lee – synthesisers

Production
 Chris Thomas – original production
 Daniel Lanois – original production
 Jacknife Lee – additional production, mixing
 Carl Glanville – recording
 Chris Heaney – recording assistance

Notes

U2 songs
2004 songs
Song recordings produced by Jacknife Lee
Songs written by Bono
Songs written by the Edge
Songs written by Adam Clayton
Songs written by Larry Mullen Jr.
Song recordings produced by Chris Thomas (record producer)
Song recordings produced by Daniel Lanois